Northern Christian College is a private Christian higher education institution in Laoag City, Ilocos Norte, Philippines. It was founded in 1933. It is associated with the Christian Church (Disciples of Christ) and the United Church of Christ in the Philippines. Baccalaureate programs are offered in the fields of liberal arts, ministry, nursing, teacher education, accountancy, and commerce-secretarial. The school also offers a master's degree program in education. There are 80 members on the faculty, and student enrollment is approximately 2000.

History
Northern Christian College, Inc. was first established as Northern Luzon Christian College in Vigan, Ilocos Sur in 1933. The college moved to Laoag City in 1943, but was closed the next year due to World War II. The school was reopened as Northern Christian College in 1946.

Academics
In 2007, NCC registered approximately 2000 undergraduate and graduate students. All programs in offered by NCC are recognized by the Commission on Higher Education (CHED) and range from degrees (A.B., B.S., M.S., M.A., and Ph.D.) in several disciplines including:

Accountancy
Commerce
Education
Business management
Nursing
Political science
Public administration
Social welfare
Theology
Hotel and restaurant management

Religious Affiliation
The college is affiliated with the Christian Church (Disciples of Christ) in the United States, the INOCAG-ISU Christian Fellowship whose local churches are known as the Church of Christ Disciples and the United Church of Christ in the Philippines.

External links
Northern Christian College, Inc. official website

Schools in Laoag
Protestant schools in the Philippines
Universities and colleges in Ilocos Norte